In mathematics, an infinite geometric series of the form

is divergent if and only if | r | ≥ 1. Methods for summation of divergent series are sometimes useful, and usually evaluate divergent geometric series to a sum that agrees with the formula for the convergent case

This is true of any summation method that possesses the properties of regularity, linearity, and stability.

Examples
In increasing order of difficulty to sum:
1 − 1 + 1 − 1 + · · ·, whose common ratio is −1
1 − 2 + 4 − 8 + · · ·, whose common ratio is −2
1 + 2 + 4 + 8 + · · ·, whose common ratio is 2
1 + 1 + 1 + 1 + · · ·, whose common ratio is 1.

Motivation for study
It is useful to figure out which summation methods produce the geometric series formula for which common ratios. One application for this information is the so-called Borel-Okada principle: If a regular summation method sums Σzn to 1/(1 - z) for all z in a subset S of the complex plane, given certain restrictions on S, then the method also gives the analytic continuation of any other function  on the intersection of S with the Mittag-Leffler star for f.

Summability by region

Open unit disk
Ordinary summation succeeds only for common ratios |z| < 1.

Closed unit disk
Cesàro summation
Abel summation

Larger disks
Euler summation

Half-plane
The series is Borel summable for every z with real part < 1. Any such series is also summable by the generalized Euler method (E, a) for appropriate a.

Shadowed plane
Certain moment constant methods besides Borel summation can sum the geometric series on the entire Mittag-Leffler star of the function 1/(1 − z), that is, for all z except the ray z ≥ 1.

Everywhere

Notes

References

Divergent series
Geometric series